Les Pierres de Lecq (Jèrriais: Les Pièrres dé Lé) or the Paternosters are a group of uninhabitable rocks or a reef in the Bailiwick of Jersey between Jersey and Sark,  north of Grève de Lecq in Saint Mary, and  west of the Cotentin Peninsula in Normandy. Only three or four of the rocks remain visible at high tide: L'Êtaîthe (the eastern one), La Grôsse (the big one) and La Vouêtaîthe (the western one).

The name Paternosters is connected with a legend relating to the colonisation of Sark in the 16th century. According to this legend a boatload of women and children was wrecked on the reef and their cries can still be heard from time to time in the wind. Superstitious sailors would say the Lord's Prayer when passing the rocks, hence the name Paternosters.

The rocks are considered to form a biogeographical boundary between a cold and a warmer part of the ocean. Together with the diverse geology of the area and the differences in wave exposure of the different parts, this creates a diverse range of habitats and considerable biodiversity. The variety of algal assemblages support a range of invertebrate species and provides a nursery area for many fish species. Among the fish for which this area is important are the European sea sturgeon, the short-snouted seahorse and the Atlantic salmon. The rocks have been listed as a Ramsar site and support a variety of small cetaceans including dolphins.

Names of the rocks
The rocks all have individual names, listed here in Jèrriais:
 L'Êtchièrviéthe
 La Rocque du Nord
 L'Êtaîse or L'Êtaîthe
 Lé Bel
 Lé Longis 
 La P'tite Mathe 
 La Grôsse  (Great Rock)
 La Grand' Mathe
 La Greune dé Lé, or La Bonnette 
 La Greune du Seur-Vouêt
 L'Orange
 La Vouêtaîse, La Vouêtaîthe, or La Vouêt'rêsse
 La Cappe 
 La Douoche
 Lé Byi 
 La Rocque Mollet
 L'Êtché au Nord-Vouêt
La Galette
La Briarde
 La Sprague
La Niêthole Jean Jean or Lé Gouoillot

References

Jersey Place Names, Jèrri, 1986, 
Les Pièrres Dé Lé

External links

 (PDF) Ramsar site

Bailiwick of Jersey
Ramsar sites in Jersey